Tabanus australicus, commonly known as Australian common March fly, is a species of horse-fly in the family Tabanus. It is endemic to Australia and found in the Queensland area.

The species was first identified by Australian entomologist Frank Henry Taylor (1886–1945) in 1919. It was incorrectly identified as Tabanus queenslandii by Ferguson in 1920. 

It is blackish-brown in colour,  in length, with  grey wings. The ocelli is rudimentary or absent, the antennal flagellum usually with a basal plate and 4-annulate. On the wings the basicosta are without setulate, and the proboscis is relatively stout with large labella.

See also
 List of Tabanus species

References

Tabanidae
Insects described in 1919
Insects of Queensland
Diptera of Australasia